HNLMS Guinea was an  monitor built for the Royal Netherlands Navy in the early 1870s. Rearmed in 1887 with more modern ordnance, she was sold for scrap in 1897.

Description
She displaced . Her crew initially consisted of 117 officers and enlisted men, but later increased to 159 crewmen.

The Buffel-class monitors had two 2-cylinder compound-expansion steam engines, each driving a single propeller shaft.

The Buffel class was initially armed with two Armstrong  rifled muzzle-loading guns mounted in a single turret and four 30-pounder  smoothbore guns on the deck. In 1887 her armament was modernized.

The ship had a complete waterline armored belt that ranged in thickness from  amidships to 76 millimeters at the ends.

Construction and career
Unlike her sister ship, Guinea was built in the Netherlands. She was ordered in 1867 from the Rijkswerf in Amsterdam and was laid down that same year with the name of Matador. Renamed Guinea, after the African colony of Guinea, while under construction, she was launched on 5 May 1870 and completed on 16 October 1873. Guinea was broken up and scrapped at Bolnes in 1897.

Notes

References
 
 
 

19th-century naval ships of the Netherlands
1870 ships
Ships built in Amsterdam
Buffel-class monitors